This a list of characters of the anime series Tenkai Knights.

Tenkai Knights

Guren Nash

 is the main protagonist and leader of the new generations of Tenkai Knights. He has a knack for leadership (though he still has to grow into the role) and doesn't have fear even before more difficult things. Guren is described as always having a positive attitude. He can transform into Bravenwolf, the leader of the original Tenkai Knights. He describes himself as "Tenkai Power". Guren is the first to unlock both Titan mode, enlarging to twice his normal size and capable of releasing energy slashes, and Elemental Titan mode, though he does lose it for a period of episodes. He is best friends with Ceylan, Toxsa, Chooki, and soon, Gen and Beni. After being infused with a Dragon Cube, his appearance changed and was known as Bravenwolf Tenkai Firestorm. With his new elemental power, this allows him to a giant ball of fire on the tip of his sword and throw it at the target.

Ceylan Jones

 is friendly, goofy, outgoing and a big practical joker. When not goofing off however, he can be surprisingly cautious. Ceylan can transform into Tributon. He describes himself as "Tenkai Speed". As Tributon, he is armed with a Tenkai Crossbow and Arrow Blaster and a shield. Ceylan is the second to unlock Titan mode, enlarging to twice his normal size and using a long bow blaster to shoot energy.

During the course of the series, in some episodes, Ceylan does get a bit depressed, due to his skills not meeting the skills of his other fellow Knights. Due to this depression, he almost quits the team in one episode, but thankfully, his friends remind him of what he brings to the table.

At one point in the series he dubbed himself "Ceylan Awesome Jones".

Toxsa Dalton

 is at least as smart as them and thus in the same grade, though Toxsa's a year younger than his teammates. He is something of a tech geek. Toxsa enjoys playing video games and tinkering with digital equipment when not helping out at his family's diner. He is quirky, short-tempered and is more comfortable with computers than with people. Toxsa can transform into Valorn. He describes himself as "Tenkai Strength" and also claimed to be the physically strongest of the Knights. As Valorn, he is armed with a Tenkai Lance that can fire green energy charges or a green energy beam from the end as well as a shield. Toxsa is the fourth and last to unlock Titan mode, enlarging to twice his normal size and gaining a sword like polearm that can split open to release large energy blasts.

Chooki Mason

 has a calm disposition. He is the best athlete of the team and always looks forward to a challenge. Chooki can transform into Lydendor. He describes himself as "Tenkai Agility". As Lydendor, he is armed with a Tenkai Kunai Saber with Chain that he can wield in melee combat or cause the blade to shoot out on a chain to use it as a flail⁠, and a shield that has three curved blades that he can throw and have it return to him. Chooki is the third to unlock Titan mode, enlarging to twice his normal size and his shield resembles a large shuriken which he uses offensively and defensively.

Gen

 is a mysterious new student who transfers to Guren's school. He formerly worked under Vilius and can transform into Dromus, a Tenkai Knight who bears a strong resemblance to Bravenwolf except with grey & black armor with a scar on the left eye of his chest plate, and like Guren he too describes himself as "Tenkai Power". Gen had lost his mother and father for some unknown reasons and was given the Dromus brick by the Tenkai guardian Eurus. After Vilius stole the Black Dragon Key from him, he became the official 5th member of the Tenkai Knights and an ally of the Corekai Soldiers.

Mr. White

 is the owner of the Shop of Wonders. "My Shop Has Absolutely Everything Under the Sun" is what he proclaims to customers. Mr. White admits that the shop is not very successful since it didn't have any customer for years. In his shop's basement, he also protects the portal to the planet Quarton alongside his friend Boreas and tries to train the Earth-Modernized Tenkai Knights.

Beni

 is a pink-haired girl who was an accomplice to Gen. She can transform into Venetta, an evil Tenkai Knight with armor that resembles a spider. She seeks to have both worlds destroyed because her father spent more time searching for Quarton and less time with her, feeling that both worlds destroyed her life. Beni tricked the Tenkai Knights into thinking she had turned over a new leaf, but she and Gen worked together to trick the Tenkai Knights into finding the Dragon Key for them. She later went rogue after finding out Lord Vilius stole the Black Dragon Key from Dromus. Beni eventually officially turns over a new leaf for real after meeting and spending time with Chooki's cousin Kiro, and becomes the 6th & only female member of the Tenkai Knights as well becoming an ally to the Corekai Soldiers in the season 1 finale.

Corekai (Spectros)

Beag

 is the founder and commander of the Corekai Soldiers. He is often confused by the otherworldly comments the young six Tenkai Knights make due to him not knowing they aren't the original Tenkai Knights. Beag seems to have a case of hero worship, but is fairly intelligent. He and his four allies Kutor, Leinad, Senjo, and Tavox joined the Tenkai Knights in Robofusion, granting them the ability to use both the Protojet and the Airlancer Jet at the same time. He also saves the Tenkai Knights a lots in the Beast World, due to them being powerless as humans. He also changes in the Beast World from brick-looking to a robot, due to the fact that all the tenkai knights must be human. He helped a lot in the final battle, when he traveled to Earth to remove both Granox and Slyger, and also was ready to sacrifice himself for the fortress.

Other members
 Tavox
 A gray and green Corekai Soldier.

 Senjo
 A gray and yellow Corekai Soldier.

 Leinad
 A white and red Corekai Soldier.

 Kutor
 A white and blue Corekai Soldier.

 Corekai Cadets
 The Corekai Cadets are Foot Cadets who work for Beag, Kutor, Leinad, Senjo, Tavox, and the Tenkai Knights.

Corrupted (Veclipse)

Vilius

 is the main antagonist of the first season. He was once a Tenkai Knight, but his energy became negative and turned against his former teammates. From then, Vilius leads the Corrupted Army as their warlord to obtain Tenkai Energy and awakening the Tenkai Dragon. He is a very intelligent leader, and a deadly warrior with an armor that represents the Bat with a trident as his only weapon. Vilius can use Robofusion with the foot soldiers to turn into the Xenoship and can also assume Titan mode. Although he has been defeated by Bravenwolf, he still manages to come back to life and makes plans to also invade Earth.

Granox

 is a powerful henchman who works under Vilius. His armor seems based on a Rhinoceros' armor, and he is armed with a halberd or axe on a pole with a shield. Granox is usually a coward avoiding danger, and seeks to utilize his opponents' weaknesses.

During battles, the Tenkai Knights called him by many offensive names, the most appearing is "Bucket Head." 

Granox was also the second robot to be sent to Earth from Quarton, using the newly pilfered teleporter.

Slyger

 is another powerful henchman who works under Vilius. He is armed with two claws and may be based on a tiger's armor. Slyger maybe sneaky and cunning, but he is also brave unless it comes to the Tenkai Knights.

Other members
 
  
 Rho is a member of the Corrupted. In the episode "Toxsa 2.0," he was empowered by Vilius and put under Granox's command. He assisted in the capture and mind scan of Valorn. He has a robofusion called the Flying Darkwing Spector with three Hos and was destroyed by Valorn. Rho was later revived by Vilius.

 
 A black and pale yellow Corrupted Soldier. In "Robofusion," he was given the ability to combine with Granox, Slyger, and a Sho to form the Sickle Ship.

 
 The Hos are bull-like Mech Beasts that serves as the ground force for the Corrupted.

 
 The Sho are flying dragon-like Mech Beasts that serves as the air force for the Corrupted.

 
 The Sky Griffins are griffin-like Mech Beast that serves as an alternative air force for the Corrupted. They have been known to Robofuse with Slyger.

 
 The War Stallions are horse-like Mech Beasts that serves as an alternative ground force for the Corrupted. They are known to Robofuse with Granox.

Guardians
The  are a group of Quarton beings who are the protectors of Quarton and are named after the members of the Anemoi. Among the members of the Guardians of Quarton are:

Boreas

 is the guardian of the portal between Earth and Quarton that is hidden under the basement of Mr. White's shop. He helped the Tenkai Knights revive the Tenkai Dragon in order to stop Villius. And when Villius revived the dragon with the Black Dragon Key, he and the other Guardians voted to intervene on Quarton.

Eurus

 is a guardian from Quarton that is helping Gen and Beni (in their forms of Dromus and Venetta) find the Black Key. He feels that Boreas has upset the balance of Tenkai Energy, but he was pretending by thinking that he turned his back on his Guardian friends and realized that he was working for the Guardians by helping the Knights to take down Villius once and for all.

Zephyrus

 is also one of the guardians. In episode 27, he is influenced by Vilius to revive him.

Notus

 is one of the guardians.

Beast World

Orangor

Orangor is an annoying orange ape robot from Beast World. So annoying that he impersonated Guren's cat Max.

Scorpidon

The Beast King and ruler of Beast World. As his name suggests, his appearance is a giant scorpion robot. Desperate of entertainment, he challenged the Tenkai Knights and Villus to a series of challenges. The reward was that they can go home, but he keeps changing the rules to prevent them from leaving. It isn't until after being defeated in combat that Scorpidon is satisfied and sends them back to their world.

Other characters

Humans
 Mr. Nash
 
 Mr. Nash is Guren's father who is a businessman.

 Mrs. Nash
 Mrs. Nash is Guren's mother who is deceased and is only seen in Guren's Family photos

Mr. Jones

Mr. Jones is Ceylan's father who is a businessman.

 Mrs. Jones
 
 Mrs. Jones is Ceylan's mother.

 Ms. Finwick
 
 Ms. Finwick is Guren, Ceylan, and Gen's history teacher.

 
 
 Wakamei is Toxsa's older sister. She also works as a waitress at her family's Turtle diner. In "Extreme Titan", she learns about his secret and pretends that she understands Toxsa to have been playing part in a video game.

 Mrs. Dalton
 
 Mrs. Dalton is Wakamei and Toxsa's mother. She owns the Turtle diner with her husband.

 Mr. Dalton
 
 Mr. Dalton is Wakamei and Toxsa's father. He works as a chef at the family's Turtle diner that he and his wife own.

 Kiro Mason
 
 Kiro is Chooki's little cousin/sister who later becomes Beni's best friend.

Legendary beasts
 
 A gigantic dragon that serves as the neutral defense system of the planet Quarton. It was once under the possession of Vilius and used to exterminate any target and wipe out several Corekai armies due to its incredible power. However, it was defeated and sealed into several fragments by the Tenkai Knights and only the White Dragon Key or the Black Dragon Key are required to unseal it. The team who commands the dragon depends on which key is used to awaken it (Black Key=Bad Dragon, White Key=Good Dragon). When Villus returns, he steals the dragon cubes from the knights in order to revive it. But because Villus didn't use the Dragon Keys to revive the dragon it became unstable and split off by a single blow from Dromus, into 5 white (good) and black (bad) cubes in which the white cubes are absorbed by the Tenkai Knights & Dromus, and the black cubes to Villus respectively granting them their Elemental Titan modes. Later it's revealed that they can use the dragon cubes they absorbed to each summon a separate dragon, a good to the Tenkai Knights and an evil to Vilius (Both Summoned at the same time) for commands.

 Tenkai Wolf
 Hidden within the Tenkai Fortress, the Tenkai Wolf was summoned after the crest Bravenwolf received from Orangor activated. It granted Bravenwolf a new form and powers and proceeded to fight alongside him to defeat Villius. He is super powerful.

References

Lists of characters in Canadian television animation
Child characters in television
Teenage characters in television
Lists of anime and manga characters
Television characters introduced in 2013